Antonio Gamero Aguirre (2 March 1934 – 26 July 2010) was a Spanish actor. Primarily known by his supporting roles, he featured in over 200 titles.

Biography 
Antonio Gamero Aguirre was born in Madrid on 2 March 1934. Prior to acting, he worked for Telefónica. A member of the Communist Party of Spain (clandestine during the Francoist dictatorship) since 1957 under the alias 'Alejandro', he was tortured in the DGS headquarters in Puerta del Sol by a police agent who ruptured his eardrums. He had to wear a hearing aid for the rest of his life. Following the beating, he spent two years in prison because of his political activity, after which he was not allowed to direct films and had to deliver screenplays under the pseudonym 'Pilar García', henceforth deciding to become an actor out of necessity. He made his feature film acting debut in 1969 film Historia de la vida de Blancanieves.

He died on 26 July 2010 at Madrid's Hospital General Universitario Gregorio Marañón.

He is the father of producer Mercedes Gamero.

References 

Spanish male film actors
20th-century Spanish male actors
21st-century Spanish male actors
Actors from Madrid
1934 births
2010 deaths
Spanish torturees